Naranjito Canton is a canton of Ecuador, located in the Guayas Province.  Its capital is the town of Naranjito.  Its population at the 2001 census was 31,756.

Demographics
Ethnic groups as of the Ecuadorian census of 2010:
Mestizo  71.2%
Afro-Ecuadorian  8.3%
Montubio  7.7%
White  6.5%
Indigenous  6.1%
Other  0.3%

References

Cantons of Guayas Province